Gorman is a city in Eastland County, Texas, United States. Its population was 1,083 at the 2010 census, down from 1,236 at the 2000 census.

Geography

Gorman is located in southeastern Eastland County at  (32.211956, –98.671281). Texas State Highway 6 passes through the community, leading northwest  to Eastland, the county seat, and southeast  to De Leon.

Demographics

2020 census

As of the 2020 United States census, there were 976 people, 501 households, and 331 families residing in the city.

2000 census
As of the census of 2000,  1,236 people, 474 households, and 310 families were residing in the city. The population density was 750.7 people per square mile (289.2/km). The 569 housing units averaged 345.6/sq mi (133.1/km). The racial makeup of the city was 80.42% White, 0.08% African American, 0.89% Native American, 17.72% from other races, and 0.89% from two or more races. Hispanics or Latinos of any race were 29.13% of the population.

Of the 474 households,  33.1% had children under  18 living with them, 51.1% were married couples living together, 9.7% had a female householder with no husband present, and 34.4% were not families. About 32.7% of all households were made up of individuals, and 21.1% had someone living alone who was 65 or older. The average household size was 2.53, and the average family size was 3.24.

In the city, the age distribution was 28.2% under 18, 8.4% from 18 to 24, 24.1% from 25 to 44, 18.4% from 45 to 64, and 20.8% who were 65 years of age or older. The median age was 38 years. For every 100 females, there were 85.9 males. For every 100 females age 18 and over, there were 79.9 males.

The median income for a household in the city was $26,758, and for a family was $32,431. Males had a median income of $25,800 versus $18,417 for females. The per capita income for the city was $11,906. 16.3% of the population and 10.1% of families were below the poverty line. Out of the total population, 20.4% of those under the age of 18 and 19.6% of those 65 and older were living below the poverty line.

Education
The city is served by the Gorman Independent School District.

Climate
The climate in this area is characterized by hot, humid summers and generally mild to cool winters.  According to the Köppen climate classification, Gorman has a humid subtropical climate, Cfa on climate maps.

Notable people
 Joe Isbell, NFL football player

References

External links
City of Gorman official website
Gorman Independent School District

Cities in Texas
Cities in Eastland County, Texas